Al Mithnab is one of the governorates in Al-Qassim Region, Saudi Arabia.

References 

Populated places in Al-Qassim Province
Governorates of Saudi Arabia